A115 or A.115 may refer to:
 A115 motorway (France)
 A 115 motorway (Germany)
 A115 road (Great Britain)
 Agusta A.115, a helicopter
 Ansaldo A.115, an Italian 1920s aircraft whose development lead to the 1925 Ansaldo A.120 aircraft
 RFA Airsprite (A115), a tanker ship
 RMAS Lodestone (A115), a degaussing ship